3192 A'Hearn, provisional designation , is a carbonaceous asteroid from the inner regions of the asteroid belt, about 6 kilometers in diameter. It was discovered by American astronomer Edward Bowell at Lowell's Anderson Mesa Station in Flagstaff, Arizona, on 30 January 1982.

Orbit and classification 

The C-type asteroid orbits the Sun in the inner main-belt at a distance of 2.0–2.8 AU once every 3 years and 8 months (1,339 days). Its orbit has an eccentricity of 0.17 and an inclination of 3° with respect to the ecliptic. The first precovery was obtained at El Leoncito in 1975, extending the asteroid's observation arc by 7 years prior to its discovery.

Physical characteristics 

A rotational lightcurve for this asteroid was obtained from photometric observations made by Japanese astronomer Sunao Hasegawa, using the 1.05-meter Schmidt telescope at Kiso Observatory in March 2004. It showed a well-defined rotation period of 3.16 hours with a brightness amplitude of 0.20 in magnitude. According to the survey carried out by NASA's Wide-field Infrared Survey Explorer with its subsequent NEOWISE mission, the asteroid measures 4.4 kilometers in diameter and its surface has a high albedo of 0.354. The Collaborative Asteroid Lightcurve Link assumes a standard albedo for stony asteroids of 0.20 – despite the fact that the body has been classified as a carbonaceous C-type – and calculates a diameter of 5.7 kilometers with an absolute magnitude of 13.6.

Naming 

This minor planet was named for American cometary astronomer and professor of astronomy at CMNS, Michael A'Hearn (b. 1940), known for his contribution to cometary science, especially for his wide-range spectroscopic and spectrophotometric observations. He participated in the space-based EPOXI and IUE mission, which, in 1983, detected for the first time the presence of cometary diatomic sulfur while observing Comet IRAS–Araki–Alcock spectrum. The official naming citation was published by the Minor Planet Center on 22 June 1986.

References

External links 
 Asteroid Lightcurve Database (LCDB), query form (info )
 Dictionary of Minor Planet Names, Google books
 Asteroids and comets rotation curves, CdR – Observatoire de Genève, Raoul Behrend
 Discovery Circumstances: Numbered Minor Planets (1)-(5000) – Minor Planet Center
 
 

003192
Discoveries by Edward L. G. Bowell
Named minor planets
003192
19820130